Nishiarakawa Dam is a gravity dam located in Tochigi prefecture in Japan. The dam is used for flood control. The catchment area of the dam is 24.8 km2. The dam impounds about 28  ha of land when full and can store 4300 thousand cubic meters of water. The construction of the dam was started on 1962 and completed in 1968.

References

Dams in Tochigi Prefecture
1968 establishments in Japan